Thiago Galvão da Silva (born 24 August 1989), commonly known as Thiago Galvão, is a Brazilian footballer who plays for Armenian club FC Alashkert. He is most frequently played as either a striker or an attacking midfielder.

Club career
Thiago Galvão played in Brazil with Paulista Futebol Clube from 2007 to 2010. In 2011, he joined Serbian side Sloboda Užice.

Sloboda Užice
Thiago Galvão and Paulista teammate Ricardinho came to Serbia in January 2011 and played 11 matches with newly promoted FK Sloboda Point Sevojno until the end of the season. He made his league debut coming on as a late substitute against FK Spartak Zlatibor Voda in April 2011.

2010–11 season
Upon joining Sloboda in 2011, Thiago Galvão spent the first season adjusting to the league in Serbia, during which he didn't score a single goal in the 11 games he appeared in.

2011–12 season
His exhibitions from previous season satisfied the club management and during summer he was offered to stay, while Ricardinho returned to Brazil. He immediately responded by being named the best player of the main tournament his club played during summer pre-season.
During the summer Sloboda changed much of the squad. As a result, Thiago got more playing time and started 29 games out of 29 games he played. Even though he played as a striker at Paulista, coach Ljubiša Stamenković gave him the role of an attacking midfielder. In the first half of the 2011–12 season, he and Filip Kasalica (before he departed to join Red Star Belgrade) were listed as the most formidable striker partnership in the entire league. Thiago scored 6 goals and had 8 assists that season and was one of the best players in the league, attracting interest from domestic clubs as well as clubs from the Western Europe.

2012–13 season
During the 2013 winter transfer window, clubs such as FK Partizan, Red Star Belgrade, and FC Rostov were interested in Thiago Galvão. Rostov even made a bid of €450,000 for the player, but Sloboda rejected it. In March during a game against FK Jagodina, Thiago scored a beautiful overhead kick goal. He helped the club finish fifth for the second straight season with 8 goals and 8 assists. He played all 30 games. For the second season in a row Galvão was included in the league's most statistically effective strike partnership, this time with Predrag Ranđelović who replaced Kasalica upon his departure to Red Star Belgrade.

2013–14 season
The 2013 season started slowly with Thiago Galvão having a goalless drought for six straight games, due to still recovering from injury, and then he scored his first hat-trick for the club on 25 September, against Teleoptik in the Serbian Cup. He scored his first league goal against OFK Beograd on 5 October 2013. On 23 November Tiago scored another overhead kick, this time against Red Star to give his team the lead, but Sloboda lost 4–1. On 22 April 2014, Tiago played his 100th game for Sloboda against Javor, providing the only goal of the game with an assist. In what was a really poor season for Sloboda, finishing last and getting relegated, Tiago was by far the best player.

Sheriff Tiraspol
On 3 July 2014, Thiago Galvão signed for Moldovan side FC Sheriff Tiraspol.

Pyunik
On 17 January 2022, Galvão signed for Pyunik.

Honours
Pyunik
 Armenian Premier League: 2021–22
Sheriff Tiraspol
Moldovan Cup: 2015
Moldovan Super Cup: 2016

Statistics

References

External links
 Profile at Sloboda official website
 Thiago Galvão at Srbijafudbal
 Thiago Galvão at playmakerstats.com (English version of ogol.com.br)
 Thiago Galvão bio and stats at utakmica.rs 

1989 births
Living people
Footballers from São Paulo
Brazilian footballers
Brazilian expatriate footballers
Association football forwards
Paulista Futebol Clube players
FK Sloboda Užice players
FK Čukarički players
FK Borac Čačak players
FC Sheriff Tiraspol players
G.D. Chaves players
Floriana F.C. players
Serbian SuperLiga players
Moldovan Super Liga players
Primeira Liga players
Expatriate footballers in Serbia
Expatriate footballers in Portugal
Expatriate footballers in Moldova
Expatriate footballers in Malta